The 1973 Women's World Outdoor Bowls Championship was held at the Victoria Bowls Club in Wellington, New Zealand, from 3 to 18 December 1973.

Elsie Wilkie won the singles which was held in a round robin format. The pairs was won by Australia whilst the triples, fours Gold and Taylor Trophy all went to New Zealand.

Medallists

Results

Women's singles – round robin

Women's pairs – round robin

Women's triples – round robin

+ more shots

Women's fours – round robin

Taylor Trophy

References

World Outdoor Bowls Championship
Bowls in New Zealand
World
1973 in New Zealand sport
December 1973 sports events in New Zealand